This list of Maltese disasters by death toll includes disasters that occurred either in Malta or incidents outside of the country in which a number of Maltese citizens were killed. It does not include death tolls from war.

List

See also
List of accidents and disasters by death toll (worldwide)

References

Malta
Death in Malta
Disasters
Disasters in Malta
Malta